Hot Country Songs is a chart that ranks the top-performing country music songs in the United States, published by Billboard magazine.  In 2005, twenty different songs topped the chart, published under the title Hot Country Singles & Tracks through the April 23 issue, in 52 issues of the magazine, based on weekly airplay data from country music radio stations compiled by Nielsen SoundScan.

Singer Blake Shelton's song "Some Beach" was at number one at the start of the year, having risen to the top in the issue of Billboard dated December 25, 2004.  The song remained at number one for three further weeks until it was replaced at the top by "Awful, Beautiful Life" by Darryl Worley in the issue dated January 22.  Australian singer Keith Urban spent the most weeks at number one in 2005, with eleven, comprising five weeks with "Making Memories of Us" and six with "Better Life", which tied for the most weeks at number one by a single song with "As Good as I Once Was" by Toby Keith.  Two other acts reached the top of the chart with more than one song in 2005.  Brooks & Dunn topped the chart with "It's Getting Better All the Time" in May and "Play Something Country" in September, although each only spent one week at number one.  Rascal Flatts, in contrast, spent eight weeks in total at number one with their two chart-toppers, "Bless the Broken Road" and  "Fast Cars and Freedom".

Although it did not spend as long at the top as Urban and Keith's songs, the song that was ranked number one on Billboards year-end chart of the most popular country songs was "That's What I Love About Sunday" by Craig Morgan, which spent four weeks at number one in March and April.  Despite this success, it remains Morgan's only Hot Country Songs number one.  Two other artists reached the top of the chart for the first time in 2005.  In March, Josh Gracin achieved his first number one with "Nothin' to Lose", making him the first of a number of former American Idol finalists to achieve success on the country charts.  In the final week of the year, Billy Currington topped the chart for the first time with "Must Be Doin' Somethin' Right".

Chart history

See also
2005 in music
List of artists who reached number one on the U.S. country chart

References

2005
United States Country Singles
2005 in American music